Interactive proof can refer to: 

 The abstract concept of an Interactive proof system
 Interactive theorem proving software